The Corn Belt Conference was a high school athletic conference in the Illinois High School Association (IHSA), based in Central Illinois. The conference consisted of medium-sized and small high schools.

History
The Corn Belt Conference was originally formed in 1950 by Clinton, Normal Community, Pontiac Township, Trinity (later Central Catholic), and University High Schools. The conference was incorporated into the former Heart of Illinois Conference in 1972 but was reformed in 1978.

Eureka High School left the Corn Belt Conference for the Heart of Illinois Conference after the 2015-2016 school year. U-High and Mahomet-Seymour departed for the Central State Eight Conference and Apollo Conference respectively in the 2017-18 school year. In April 2016, school boards of the remaining five schools and the school boards of the five schools in the Okaw Valley Conference voted unanimously to merge into a new Illini Prairie Conference beginning in the 2017-18 school year.

Member schools

1950–1972

1978–2017

References

External links

Illinois high school sports conferences
Education in McLean County, Illinois